is a passenger railway station located in the city of Koganei, Tokyo, Japan.

Lines

Station layout
The station has two opposed ground-level side platforms serving two tracks, connected by a level crossing.

Platforms

History
The station was opened on October 22, 1917.

Station numbering was introduced on all Seibu Railway lines during fiscal 2012, with Shin-Koganei Station becoming "SW02".

Passenger statistics
In fiscal 2019, the station was the 80th busiest on the Seibu network with an average of 4,041 passengers daily. 

The passenger figures for previous years are as shown below.

Surrounding area
International Christian University
International Christian University High School

See also
List of railway stations in Japan

References

External links

  Shin-Koganei Station information (Seibu Railway) 

Railway stations in Japan opened in 1917
Railway stations in Tokyo
Seibu Tamagawa Line
Koganei, Tokyo